Immel is a surname. Notable people with the surname include:

Eike Immel (born 1960), German football goalkeeper and manager
Jan-Olaf Immel (born 1976), German team handball player
Jerrold Immel (born 1936), American television music composer

See also
John Immel House